The Constitution of Chad provides for freedom of religion; however, at times, the Government limited this right for certain groups. There are seldom reports of societal abuses or discrimination based on religious belief or practice. The different religious communities generally coexisted without problems, although some tensions between different Muslim groups and between Muslims and Christians were reported.

Religious demography

More than half of the population is Muslim, approximately one-third is Christian, and the remainder practice traditional indigenous religious beliefs or no religion at all. Most northerners practice Islam, and many southerners practice Christianity or traditional indigenous religious beliefs; however, population patterns are becoming more complex, especially in urban areas, and anecdotal evidence indicates that Muslim conversion is on the rise in areas that were previously Christian or animist. Many citizens, despite having stated religious affiliations, do not practice their religion regularly. 

The vast majority of Muslims are adherents of a moderate branch of mystical Islam known locally as Tijaniyah, which incorporates some local African religious elements. A small minority of Muslims (5 to 10 percent) hold more fundamentalist beliefs, which in some cases may be associated with Saudi-oriented belief systems such as Wahhabism or Salafism.

Roman Catholics represent the largest Christian denomination in the country. Most Protestants, including the Nigeria-based "Winners Chapel", are affiliated with various evangelical Christian groups. Members of the Baháʼí and Jehovah's Witnesses religious communities also are present. Both religious groups were introduced after independence in 1960 and therefore are considered "new" religious groups.

Foreign missionaries representing numerous religious groups continue to proselytize in the country.

Status of religious freedom

Legal and policy framework
Article 1 of the Chad Constitution declares that the country is a secular state and "affirm[s] the separation of the religions and of the State".

The Constitution provides for freedom of religion; however, the Government banned the religious group Al Faid al-Djaria and indirectly monitors Islamic activities through the pro-Government High Islamic Council. The Constitution also provides that the country shall be a secular state; however, some policies favor Islam in practice. For example, a committee composed of members of the High Council for Islamic Affairs and the Directorate of Religious Affairs in the Ministry of the Interior organizes the Hajj and the Umra. In the past the Association of Evangelical Churches criticized government-sponsored Hajj trips as eroding the traditionally secular stance of the country.

The Office of the Director of Religious and Traditional Affairs under the Ministry of the Interior and Public Security oversees religious matters. The office is responsible for mediating intercommunal conflict, reporting on religious practices, and ensuring religious freedom.

While the Government is legally obligated to treat all religious groups or denominations equally, non-Muslims allege that Muslims receive preferential status. In the past the Government reportedly accorded public lands to Muslim leaders for the purpose of building mosques but required representatives of other religious groups to purchase land at market rates to build places of worship.

The Director of Religious and Traditional Affairs oversees religious matters. Working under the Minister of the Interior, the Director of Religious and Traditional Affairs is responsible for arbitrating intercommunal conflicts and ensuring religious freedom. The Director also monitors religious practices within the secular state. An independent religious organization, the High Council for Islamic Affairs, oversees all Islamic religious activities, including the supervision of Arabic language schools and higher institutions and the representation of the country in international Islamic meetings.

The High Council for Islamic Affairs, in coordination with the president, also has the responsibility of appointing the grand imam—a spiritual leader for all Muslims in the country who oversees each region's high imam and serves as head of the council. In principle, the grand imam has the authority to restrict proselytizing by other Islamic groups throughout the country, regulate the content of mosque sermons, and exert control over activities of Islamic charities operating in the country. The current grand imam, Sheikh Hissein Hassan Abakar, a representative of the generally moderate Sufi (Tijaniyah) branch of Islam, is viewed as a generally moderate religious figure. He has had his authority challenged by followers of other sects of Islam who adhere to more fundamentalist teachings derived from eastern and northern Africa and the Middle East.

Religious leaders are also involved in managing the country's wealth. A representative of the religious community sits on the Revenue Management College, the body that oversees the allocation of oil revenues. The seat rotates between Muslim and Christian leaders every 4 years. In 2004 the Muslim representative handed responsibilities over to a Catholic priest designated by the Christian community. The mandate of the Christian representative at the College ended in June 2007.

The Government requires religious groups, including both foreign missionary groups and domestic religious groups, to register with the Ministry of the Interior's Department of Religious Affairs. The Department created two separate services for Muslims and Christians. Registration takes place without discrimination and is interpreted as official recognition. Despite popular perceptions to the contrary, registration is not intended to confer tax preferences or other benefits to religious groups.

The Government prohibits activity that "does not create conditions of cohabitation among the populations". This prohibition is understood to mean regulating groups who advocate sectarian tensions in the country. The Al Mountada al Islami and the World Association for Muslim Youth organizations were banned by the government for portraying violence as a legitimate precept of Islam.

Generally, foreign missionaries did not face restrictions; however, they must register and receive authorization from the Ministry of Interior to circulate within the country, as do other foreigners traveling and operating throughout the country. It is difficult to find a report that the Government withheld authorization from any group.

Public schools conduct instruction in French, and public bilingual schools conduct classes in French and Arabic. The Government prohibits religious instruction in public schools but permits all religious groups to operate private schools without restriction. The poor quality of Chad's educational system has prompted many Muslim families to look to Islamic schools as an opportunity for educating children who would otherwise have little or no access to formal schooling. Most large towns have at least one or two private religious schools. Although the Government does not publish official records on school funding, many Islamic schools were commonly understood to be financed by Arab donors (governments, nongovernmental organizations (NGOs), and individuals), particularly from Saudi Arabia, Egypt, and Libya.

In the past several human rights organizations have reported on the problem of the mahadjirin children, students of certain Islamic schools who are forced by their teachers to beg for food and money. There were no credible estimates as to the number of mahadjirin children. The High Council for Islamic Affairs appealed for an immediate end to such practices, and the Government called for the closure of such schools. Despite attempted reforms, the schools remained open.

Among the numerous private radio stations, religious organizations own several stations broadcasting throughout the country (six Christian and two Islamic). Officials closely monitored radio stations run by both nonprofit and commercial groups.

The Government celebrates both Christian and Islamic holy days as national holidays. Islamic national holidays include Eid al-Adha, the Birth of the Prophet Muhammad, and Eid al-Fitr. Christian holidays include Easter Monday, All Saints' Day, and Christmas Day. It is not uncommon for Muslims and Christians to attend each other's festivities during these holidays.

While most interfaith dialogue takes place on a voluntary basis and not through government intervention, the Government was generally supportive of these initiatives. On March 8, 2007, the Government initiated a campaign for peace, and Christian organizations organized a peaceful march to support the initiative. The Muslim religious establishment also attended, specifically the Imam of the grand mosque on behalf of the High Council of Islamic Affairs.

Restrictions on religious freedom
Al Faid al-Djaria (also spelled Al Faydal Djaria), a Sufi group that adheres to a mystical form of Islam and is found in the Kanem, Lake Chad, and Chari-Baguirimi areas, is banned by the government. The Director of Religious and Traditional Affairs, the High Council for Islamic Affairs, and certain Ulema (Muslim religious authorities) objected to some of Al Faid al-Djaria's customs, such as the incorporation of singing, dancing, and the intermixing of sexes during religious ceremonies, which they deemed un-Islamic. During the reporting period, the Minister of Interior's 2001 ban on Al Faid al-Djaria continued as the group's case remained in court; however, the group still carried out activities in the Chari Baguirmi region of the country.

The Government is believed to monitor some Islamic organizations, such as the Salafi/Wahhabi group Ansar al Sunna, which were well funded by Arab donors and able to use money and other material incentives to encourage adherence to their more austere interpretation of Islam.

There were no reports of religious detainees or prisoners in the country.

Forced religious conversion
There were no reports of forced religious conversion carried out by the Government; however, there were reports of forced conversions of prisoners to Islam by other prisoners. Reports of such cases are disputed and many observers, including human rights groups, find it extremely difficult to determine whether compulsion was used. According to the Government, such cases are due to the violent nature of certain groups within the jail, who use violence against other prisoners and try to extort money.

There were no reports of the forced religious conversion of minor U.S. citizens who had been abducted or illegally removed from the United States, or of the refusal to allow such citizens to be returned to the United States.

Societal abuses and discrimination
There are seldom reports of societal abuses or discrimination based on religious belief or practice, although there was occasional tension between Christians and Muslims as well as between more fundamentalist and more moderate Muslims. There are regular meetings between key religious leaders to discuss peaceful collaboration among their groups.

In April 2007 the Association of Evangelical Churches appealed to the Government for additional assistance in ending the conflict between nomadic herders (who are primarily Muslim) and local farmers (who are primarily Christian) in the southern part of the country; however, the Government did not respond to the appeal.

In January 2007 the Catholic Church and Association of Evangelical Churches sent a second official protest to the Government for its failure to respond to a February 2006 rally against the Danish cartoons that resulted in damage to several Christian properties and injury to an evangelical missionary. The Government did not officially respond to the complaint.

The marketplace violence between Christians and Muslims in the southern town of Bebedja that resulted in 12 dead and 21 wounded in 2004 remained a source of tension among the local populace. Some victims accused the Government of failing to investigate the cases thoroughly and conduct proper trials.

There were reports of tensions within the Muslim community. Such tensions arose from differences between the Tijaniyahs leading the High Council for Islamic Affairs and more fundamentalist groups regarding interpretations of practices, preaching, and the leading of prayers.

Most interfaith dialogues that attempted to address Christian-Muslim and Muslim-Muslim tensions were facilitated by the groups themselves and not through government intervention. Religious groups meet regularly to try to resolve sources of tension and promote greater collaboration. During these encounters, leaders discussed problems of peaceful cohabitation, tolerance, and respect for religious freedom. These dialogues were usually initiated by the Commission for Peace and Justice (CDPJ), a Catholic organization, and both Christian and non-Christian groups participated. CDPJ also held events that brought together members of the Islamic and Christian communities to discuss issues such as child domestics and herders.

There are rarely reports of tension between Christians and Muslims in reaction to proselytizing of traditional believers by evangelical Christians.

See also
Human rights in Chad
Religion in Chad

References

 United States Bureau of Democracy, Human Rights and Labor. Chad: International Religious Freedom Report 2007. This article incorporates text from this source, which is in the public domain.

Chad
Human rights in Chad